The Church of St James is a former parish church at Llangua in the north-east of Monmouthshire. Although in Wales, the church is in the Church of England rather than the Church in Wales, being part of the parish of Kentchurch in the Diocese of Hereford. It is a Grade II* listed building.

History
The church's original dedication was to St Kew, a Cornish saint believed to have been born in Llangua. The present church dates from the 14th century, with restorations in 1889 and 1954–1955. In 1886 the living of Llangua was merged by order in council with that of Kentchurch across the Wales–England border in Herefordshire. Under the Welsh Church Act 1914, border parishes could decide whether to be part of the Church of England or the Church in Wales, and "Kentchurch with Langan" [sic] voted for England.

The 20th century restorations were funded by Ivor Bulmer-Thomas, former chairman of the Redundant Churches Fund, in memory of his wife.

Architecture and description
The church is built of Old Red Sandstone. The tower has a wooden Pyramid cap. Much of the interior was remodelled in the 20th century renovations and includes a painted partition with four panels which is said to have come from a demolished chapel in Whitford, Devon.

Notes

Sources
 

Grade II* listed churches in Monmouthshire
History of Monmouthshire
Church of England church buildings in Wales
14th-century church buildings in Wales